Welcome to the Gun Show is a New Zealand music programme which first went to air on New Zealand's Alt TV, Sky Digital 65. The show is produced by former Lynfield College student Johnathon Leyland.

Format
The show is designed to support and showcase up and coming young bands. The format of the show consists of performances by bands in their rehearsal venues, and a live in-studio interview. The Gun Show crew includes hosts Johnathon Leyland, Dane Smith from former band Nihilism, Florence and Lawrence from Lynfield College, and young Ella and Ruby Zimmermann. The show has recently branched out into areas that include more than just music, for instance, the show has a number of editors and photography students working behind the scenes.

The Welcome To The Gun Show website states that their philosophy is:

Featured bands
Bands that have featured on Welcome To The Gun Show include Force Fed Trauma, White Birds And Lemons, Pink Fluffy Islands, Where's Gary's Duvet? and The Bengal Lights. Some bands featured on the show, such as False Start have since gone on to release albums, and several bands have played at Auckland's Big Day Out festival.

External links
Official Website
Official Youtube Channel
Welcome To The Gun Show on Facebook

New Zealand music television series
ALT TV original programming